Jessica Kate Plummer (born 16 September 1992) is an English actress and singer. From 2013 to 2015, she was a member of the British girl group Neon Jungle, with whom she released an album that peaked at number eight on the UK Albums Chart. She is also known for her roles as Chantelle Atkins in the BBC soap opera EastEnders (2019–2020) and as Emma in the BBC drama series The Girl Before (2021) for which she was nominated for a British Academy Television Award for Best Supporting Actress.

Aside from her singing and acting career, Plummer has also ventured into reality television; she appeared in the twentieth series of I'm a Celebrity...Get Me Out of Here in 2020.

Early life
Plummer was born in London on 16 September 1992 to a Jamaican father and English mother. She went to Burntwood School and the Hayes School for secondary education.

Career
In November 2012, music manager David Cooper began a three-month process of auditions for a new girl group to be signed to RCA Records UK. Plummer, as well as Amira McCarthy, were separately scouted while shopping in London, while Shereen Cutkelvin and Asami Zdrenka were found via their solo YouTube videos. In February 2013, it was announced that Plummer, alongside Cutkelvin, McCarthy, and Zdrenka made the line-up of new British girl group Neon Jungle. They chose the name Neon Jungle, which was derived from their song "Welcome to the Jungle", to reflect that the members were "all individual and quite different". According to Plummer, "it's like neon is bold, bright, strong individual characters and then the jungle part is the madness". In July 2013, Neon Jungle released their debut single "Trouble", which entered the UK Singles Chart at number 12 and reached the top 10 on the US Billboard Dance/Electronic Digital Songs chart.

In October 2013, Plummer, with Neon Jungle, supported Jessie J on select dates of her Alive Tour. The following month, the group performed at the annual Victoria's Secret Fashion Show. Also in October 2013, Plummer made her television debut in British science fantasy television series Wizards vs Aliens as Chloe Martin. She portrayed the role for two episodes. In November 2013, Neon Jungle's second single, "Braveheart", was released in the UK. The song peaked at number four on the UK Singles Chart and at number 19 on the ARIA charts. On 28 July 2014, Neon Jungle released their debut album Welcome to the Jungle, which entered the UK Albums Chart at number eight. The album also entered the ARIA charts, debuting at number 48. On 6 July 2015, Neon Jungle announced via their Facebook page that they were disbanding.

In November 2015, it was announced that Plummer has joined the cast of John Cameron Mitchell's directed romantic-comedy film How to Talk to Girls at Parties opposite Ruth Wilson, Nicole Kidman, Elle Fanning and Matt Lucas. It premiered at the 2017 Cannes Film Festival in May 2017. In March 2019, Plummer joined the BBC soap opera EastEnders, portraying the role of Chantelle Atkins. While on the soap, her character was involved in a high-profile domestic abuse storyline, with her on-screen husband Gray Atkins (Toby-Alexander Smith) abusing Chantelle. In September 2020, it was announced that as part of the storyline, Gray would murder Chantelle, in order to reflect the mortality rates displayed in abusive relationships and highlight the impact of the COVID-19 pandemic on domestic violence.

In November 2020, Plummer began competing in the twentieth series of I'm a Celebrity...Get Me Out of Here. She became the sixth celebrity to be eliminated alongside Russell Watson on 1 December 2020. Plummer starred as Emma in the 2021 miniseries The Girl Before, which earned her a nomination for the British Academy Television Award for Best Supporting Actress.

Personal life
In July 2016, Plummer gave birth to her daughter, Noa.

Filmography

Awards and nominations

See also
 List of I'm a Celebrity...Get Me Out of Here! (British TV series) contestants

References

External links
 

1992 births
21st-century English actresses
21st-century Black British women singers
Actresses from London
Alumni of the Identity School of Acting
Black British actresses
British contemporary R&B singers
English dance musicians
English film actresses
English people of Jamaican descent
English pop singers
English soap opera actresses
English television actresses
I'm a Celebrity...Get Me Out of Here! (British TV series) participants
Living people
People from Wandsworth
Singers from London